Becker Stone House is a historic home located at Schoharie in Schoharie County, New York.  It is a two-story, three-bay rectangular block with walls of locally quarried coursed stone and rubble and a gable roof.  When originally built between 1772 and 1775, it is reported to have had a gambrel roof.

It was listed on the National Register of Historic Places in 1979.

References

Houses on the National Register of Historic Places in New York (state)
Houses completed in 1775
Houses in Schoharie County, New York
National Register of Historic Places in Schoharie County, New York